Selva is a 1996 Indian Tamil-language romantic action film directed by A. Venkatesh. The film stars  Vijay, Swathi, Riva and Raghuvaran. The music is composed by Sirpy. The film was a successful venture, and Vijay performed a risky jump stunt in the film.

Plot 
Selva lives in a colony. He is the son of lawyer Varatharajan but he lives separately. It turns out that he is the adopted son of Varatharajan. Meanwhile, a minister's daughter moves into the colony. She moves friendly with Selva. Swathi who is in love with Selva mistakes their friendship. Vartharajan works for a terrorist group who kidnaps the minister's daughter. Selva goes to the rescue of the girl. However, Selva kills his father because Varatharajan was going to kill Kamini. Finally they will come against out of the clutch of the terrorists.

Cast

Soundtrack 
All songs were written by Vaali and music was composed by Sirpy.

Reception 
Ananda Vikatan rated the film 30 out of 100.

References

External links 
 

1996 films
1990s Tamil-language films
Indian romantic action films
Films about terrorism in India
Films scored by Deva (composer)